Nord and Til Nord are two similarly named music projects released by the Norwegian band Gåte in 2021.

Nord

Nord is the fourth studio album by the Norwegian band Gåte.

Track listing

Til Nord

Til Nord is the fifth EP released by the Norwegian band Gåte.

Track listing

References

External links
 
 
 
 

2021 albums
Gåte albums